Miltromorpha is a genus of sea snails, marine gastropod mollusks in the family Mitromorphidae, in the superfamily Conoidea the cone snails and their allies. This genus was originally described by Carpenter off the west coast of the United States. The species occur mainly on the continental shelf and in insular environments. Their real diversity is poorly understood.

Mitromorpha was previously categorized under the family Conidae, subfamily Clathurellinae..

The genus Mitrolumna  is currently treated as a synonym or subgenus of Mitromorpha, but is available for the Eastern Atlantic and Mediterranean species, if these are considered to form a distinct radiation. The same genus is also used for a number of extinct species:
 Mitrolumna atypica  † 
 Mitrolumna hortiensis  † 
 Mitrolumna oligomiocenica  † 
 Mitrolumna peyroti  † 
 Mitrolumna raulini  † 
 Mitrolumna titanocola  † 
 Mitrolumna ventriosa  †

Description
The small shells have an elongate fusiform shape. They are generally strongly spirally sculptured. The flattened shells are crossed by longitudinal plicae and revolving lirae. The aperture is long and narrowly oval. The anal sinus is in  most cases obsolete. The outer lip is acute, smooth within, occasionally scarcely sinuated posteriorly. The columella is straight, bearing a number of short plicae or teeth upon it in the middle and slightly transversely lirate.

Species
Species within the genus Mitromorpha include:

 Mitromorpha alabaster Ortega & Gofas, 2019
 Mitromorpha alba 
 Mitromorpha albosideralis 
 Mitromorpha alphonsiana 
 Mitromorpha alyssae 
 Mitromorpha ambigua 
 Mitromorpha amphibolos 
 Mitromorpha angusta 
 Mitromorpha annobonensis 
 Mitromorpha apollinis 
 Mitromorpha aspera 
 Mitromorpha axicostata 
 Mitromorpha axiscalpta 
 Mitromorpha azorensis 
 Mitromorpha barrierensis 
 Mitromorpha bassiana 
 Mitromorpha bella  
 Mitromorpha benthicola 
 Mitromorpha biplicata 
 Mitromorpha bogii 
 † Mitromorpha brachyspira  
 Mitromorpha braziliensis 
 Mitromorpha brevispira 
 Mitromorpha cachiai 
 Mitromorpha canariensis 
 Mitromorpha candeopontis 
 Mitromorpha canopusensis 
 Mitromorpha carpenteri 
 Mitromorpha chelonion 
 Mitromorpha columbellaria 
 Mitromorpha columnaria 
 Mitromorpha commutabilis 
 Mitromorpha confortinii Horro, Gori, Rosado & Rolán, 2021
 Mitromorpha cossyrae 
 Mitromorpha crassilirata 
 Mitromorpha crenipicta 
 Mitromorpha cubana  
 Mitromorpha dalli 
 Mitromorpha decussata 
 Mitromorpha denizi 
 Mitromorpha diaoyuensis 
 Mitromorpha dorcas 
 Mitromorpha dormitor 
 Mitromorpha engli 
 Mitromorpha erycinella 
 Mitromorpha exigua 
 Mitromorpha fischeri 
 Mitromorpha flammulata 
 † Mitromorpha formosa  
 Mitromorpha fuscafenestrata 
 Mitromorpha fusiformis 
 Mitromorpha gemmata 
 Mitromorpha gofasi 
 Mitromorpha gracilior 
 Mitromorpha grammatula 
 Mitromorpha granulata 
 Mitromorpha granulifera 
 † Mitromorpha granum  
 Mitromorpha hardyi Horro, Gori, Rosado & Rolán, 2021
 Mitromorpha haycocki 
 Mitromorpha herilda 
 Mitromorpha hernandezi 
 Mitromorpha hewitti 
 Mitromorpha hierroensis 
 Mitromorpha iki 
 Mitromorpha incerta 
 Mitromorpha insolens 
 Mitromorpha iozona 
 Mitromorpha iridescens 
 Mitromorpha jaguaensis 
 Mitromorpha jovis 
 Mitromorpha karpathensis 
 Mitromorpha keenae 
 Mitromorpha kennellyi 
 Mitromorpha kilburni 
 Mitromorpha laeta 
 Mitromorpha macphersonae 
 Mitromorpha maculata 
 Mitromorpha maraisi 
 Mitromorpha mariottinii 
 Mitromorpha mifsudi 
 Mitromorpha mirim 
 Mitromorpha monodi 
 Mitromorpha multicostata 
 Mitromorpha multigranosa 
 Mitromorpha nigricingulata 
 Mitromorpha nodilirata 
 Mitromorpha nofronii 
 Mitromorpha oliva 
 Mitromorpha olivoidea 
 Mitromorpha orcutti 
 † Mitromorpha panaulax 
 Mitromorpha paucilirata 
 Mitromorpha paula 
 Mitromorpha philippinensis 
 Mitromorpha pinguis 
 Mitromorpha platacme 
 Mitromorpha pleurotomoides 
 Mitromorpha popeae 
 Mitromorpha poppei 
 Mitromorpha proles 
 Mitromorpha punctata 
 Mitromorpha purae Horro, Gori, Rosado & Rolán, 2021
 Mitromorpha purpurata 
 Mitromorpha pylei 
 Mitromorpha regis 
 Mitromorpha rotundicostata 
 Mitromorpha rubrimaculata 
 Mitromorpha ryalli Horro, Gori, Rosado & Rolán, 2021
 Mitromorpha salisburyi 
 Mitromorpha sama 
 Mitromorpha sanctaluciaensis 
 Mitromorpha santosi 
 Mitromorpha saotomensis 
 Mitromorpha selene 
 Mitromorpha senegalensis 
 Mitromorpha separanda 
 Mitromorpha smithi 
 Mitromorpha spreta 
 Mitromorpha striolata 
 Mitromorpha suarezi 
 † Mitromorpha subulata 
 † Mitromorpha sutherlandica  
 Mitromorpha swinneni 
 Mitromorpha tagaroae 
 Mitromorpha tenuicolor 
 Mitromorpha tenuilirata 
 Mitromorpha thalaoides 
 Mitromorpha torticula 
 Mitromorpha tricolorata 
 Mitromorpha undulata 
 Mitromorpha unilineata 
 Mitromorpha usta 
 Mitromorpha ustulata 
 Mitromorpha volva 
 † Mitromorpha waitakiensis  
 Mitromorpha wilhelminae 
 Mitromorpha zilpha

Species brought into synonymy
 Mitromorpha (Lovellona) : synonym of Lovellona 
 Mitromorpha (Lovellona) stepheni : synonym of Anarithma stepheni 
 Mitromorpha atramentosa : synonym of Lovellona atramentosa 
 Mitromorpha baileyi : synonym of Cymakra baileyi 
 Mitromorpha brazieri : synonym of Scrinium brazieri 
 Mitromorpha coronata (Reeve, 1849): synonym of Pygmaeconus papalis (Weinkauff, 1875)
 Mitromorpha costifera : synonym of Apaturris costifera 
 Mitromorpha expeditionis : synonym of Apaturris expeditionis 
 Mitromorpha filosa  synonym of Mitromorpha carpenteri 
 Mitromorpha flindersi : synonym of Mitromorpha alba  
 Mitromorpha granata : synonym of Cymakra granata 
 Mitromorpha jaguaense : synonym of Mitromorpha jaguaensis 
 Mitromorpha lirata : synonym of Antimitra lirata 
 Mitromorpha mediterranea : synonym of Mitromorpha columbellaria 
 Mitromorpha melitensis : synonym of Mitromorpha olivoidea 
 Mitromorpha metula : synonym of Anarithma metula 
 Mitromorpha micaria : synonym of Pygmaeconus micarius 
 Mitromorpha mitriformis (Shasky, 1961): synonym of Arielia mitriformis Shasky, 1961
 Mitromorpha olivoidea var. granulosa : synonym of Mitromorpha columbellaria 
 Mitromorpha pallidula : synonym of Aesopus pallidulus 
 Mitromorpha papalis : synonym of Pygmaeconus papalis 
 Mitromorpha peaseana : synonym of Lovellona peaseana 
 Mitromorpha sanctaluciaense E: synonym of Mitromorpha sanctaluciaensis  (wrong gender agreement of specific epithet)
 Mitromorpha solida : synonym of Aesopus solidus 
 Mitromorpha stepheni : synonym of Anarithma stepheni 
 Mitromorpha substriata (Suter, 1899): synonym of Aoteatilia substriata (Suter, 1899)
 Mitromorpha suteri : synonym of Maorimorpha suteri 
 Mitromorpha veneris : synonym of Charitodoron veneris

References

 Mifsud C. (2001). The genus Mitromorpha Carpenter, 1865 (Neogastropoda, Turridae), and its sub-genera with notes on the European species. Published by the Author, Rabat, Malta 32 pp
 Gofas, S.; Le Renard, J.; Bouchet, P. (2001). Mollusca, in: Costello, M.J. et al. (Ed.) (2001). European register of marine species: a check-list of the marine species in Europe and a bibliography of guides to their identification. Collection Patrimoines Naturels, 50: pp. 180–213

External links
 Carpenter, P. P. (1865). Diagnoses of new forms of Mollusca, from the west coast of North America, first collected by Col. E. Jewett. Annals and Magazine of Natural History. ser. 3, 15: 177-182
 Hervier, J. "Le genre Columbella dans l’Archipel de la Nouvelle-Calédonie." Journal de Conchyliologie 46 (1899): 305-391
 Casey T.L. (1904) Notes on the Pleurotomidae with description of some new genera and species. Transactions of the Academy of Science of St. Louis, 14, 123–170
 Hedley C. (1922). A revision of the Australian Turridae. Records of the Australian Museum. 13(6): 213-359
  Bouchet, P.; Kantor, Y. I.; Sysoev, A.; Puillandre, N. (2011). A new operational classification of the Conoidea (Gastropoda). Journal of Molluscan Studies. 77(3): 273-308
 Amati B., Smriglio C. & Oliverio M. (2015). Revision of the Recent Mediterranean species of Mitromorpha Carpenter, 1865 (Gastropoda, Conoidea, Mitromorphidae) with the description of seven new species. Zootaxa. 3931(2): 151-195
 Worldwide Mollusc Species Data Base: Mitromorphidae
 

 
Gastropod genera